Statistics of Kyrgyzstan League for the 1998 season.

Overview
It was contested by 20 teams, and CAG Dinamo MVD Bishkek won the championship.

First stage

Zone A

Zone B

Final stage

References
Kyrgyzstan – List of final tables (RSSSF)

Kyrgyzstan League seasons
1
Kyrgyzstan
Kyrgyzstan